Country Code: +297International Call Prefix: 00

Telephone numbers in Aruba have country code 297. It is one of the few countries outside Africa to have a country code starting with 2. Before Aruba seceded from the Netherlands Antilles in 1986, it was part of the Netherlands Antilles numbering plan (+599) with phone numbers starting with +599 8. Landline numbers begin with 28, 52 or 58. Mobile numbers begin with a 56, 59, 64, 73, 74 or 99.  Numbers are seven digits long, otherwise in line with the North American Numbering Plan, despite not being part of it.

See also
Telephone numbers in the Netherlands
Telephone numbers in Curaçao and the Caribbean Netherlands
Telephone numbers in Sint Maarten (NANP)

References

Aruba
Communications in Aruba
Telephone numbers